Franz Ferdinand Heyman (17 August 1924 – 28 March 2005) was a British physicist who served as Quain Professor from 1975–80 at University College London. He was featured in Who's Who in British Scientists, Who's Who in Atoms and Who's Who in Technology.

Education and early career
He earned his BsC at University of Cape Town in 1944 and his Ph.D University College London in 1953 before serving as an assistant lecturer from 1950–52 before being promoted as lecturer from 1952–1966 at University College London.

Selected publications
 "Parity conservation in n° production by neutrons", Nuovo Cim 1959
 "Quenching of ortho positronium in helium", Proc R Soc 1962

References

Academics of University College London
British physicists
1924 births
2005 deaths
British expatriates in South Africa